Halloween H20: Twenty Years Later (also known as simply Halloween H20) is a 1998 American slasher film directed by Steve Miner, and starring Jamie Lee Curtis, LL Cool J, Adam Arkin, Michelle Williams, Janet Leigh and Josh Hartnett in his film debut. It is the seventh installment in the Halloween franchise. Ignoring the Jamie Lloyd story arc of the previous three installments, H20 is a direct sequel to Halloween II (1981). It follows a post-traumatic Laurie Strode, who has faked her death in order to go into hiding from her murderous brother, Michael Myers, who finds her working at a private boarding school in California.

Halloween H20 was released in the United States on August 5, 1998. The film received mixed or average reviews from critics, with many saying it was at that point the best of the sequels but still paled compared to the original. It grossed $75 million worldwide against a budget of $17 million, making it the highest-grossing film in the franchise until the release of the 2018 film. A sequel, Halloween: Resurrection, was released four years later in 2002. A remake of the original film would be released in 2007 with a sequel of its own in 2009, and later another trilogy of sequels throughout 2018, 2021, and 2022 that follow only the original film, disregarding all previous entries.

Plot
On October 29, 1998, Michael Myers burgles Dr. Sam Loomis' retirement house in Langdon, Illinois. Loomis' former colleague, Marion Chambers, who took care of Dr. Loomis until he died, arrives and discovers that the file on Laurie Strode (who is presumed dead in an automobile accident) is missing. Michael murders her, her teenage neighbor Jimmy, and his friend Tony before leaving the house in Jimmy’s car with Laurie's file.

In Summer Glen, California, Laurie (having faked her death to avoid Michael) lives under an assumed name, "Keri Tate." She is the headmistress of Hillcrest Academy, a private boarding school. Her career is supported by her secretary Norma Watson and the Hillcrest guidance counselor Will Brennan, who she is also in a relationship with. However, Laurie is far from happy, as the tragic events from 1978 still haunt her; she lives in fear that Michael may return for her. While a woman and her daughter are at a rest stop, Michael steals their car. At the academy campus, the students leave to attend a school trip to Yosemite, leaving only Laurie; Will; security guard Ronny Jones; Laurie's son John; his girlfriend Molly Cartwell; and their classmate Charlie Deveraux plus his girlfriend Sarah Wainthrope, who are having a Halloween party in the school basement.

Laurie receives some maternal advice from Norma before she leaves work for the weekend and later that night reveals her true identity to Will while Michael arrives at the school. He quickly murders Charlie and Sarah before attacking John and Molly, who are rescued by Laurie and Will, and Michael and Laurie come face to face for the first time in 20 years. Will accidentally shoots Ronny (who had been patrolling the hallway) when he mistakes Ronny's shadow for Michael, and Michael kills Will while Will and Laurie are examining Ronny's body.

Laurie manages to get John and Molly to safety, and realizing that she'll never be safe from Michael as long as he's alive, decides to confront Michael head-on. Laurie stabs Michael numerous times and pushes him over a balcony. She prepares to stab him again, but Ronny (who survived the shooting) stops her. The authorities arrive at the scene and load Michael into a coroner's van, but Laurie, knowing that Michael is still alive, steals the van to kill him for good. Michael awakens and attacks Laurie, who slams on her brakes, sending Michael crashing through the windshield. As Michael rises again, Laurie hits him with the van before sending them both tumbling down a steep embankment. Laurie, having fallen out of the van, discovers Michael pinned between the van and a tree. Michael reaches for Laurie, who feels a moment of pity for her brother, before she finally decapitates him with an axe.

Cast

 Jamie Lee Curtis as Laurie Strode (Keri Tate)
 Josh Hartnett as John Tate
 Adam Arkin as Will Brennan 
 Michelle Williams as Molly Cartwell
 Adam Hann-Byrd as Charlie Deveraux 
 Jodi Lyn O'Keefe as Sarah Wainthrope
 Janet Leigh as Norma Watson 
 LL Cool J as Ronald 'Ronny' Jones
 Chris Durand as Michael Myers
 Nancy Stephens as Marion Chambers-Whittington
 Joseph Gordon-Levitt as Jimmy Howell
 Branden Williams as Tony Alegre
 Beau Billingslea as Detective Fitzsimmons
 Matt Winston as Matt Sampson
 Larisa Miller as Claudia
 Emmalee Thompson as Casey
 Tom Kane as Dr. Sam Loomis (voice)
 Lisa Gay Hamilton as Shirley 'Shirl' Jones (voice)

Production

The original idea for the seventh Halloween film began as the second half of the treatment written by Daniel Farrands during pre-production of Halloween: The Curse of Michael Myers, which he later submitted as a new treatment entitled Michael Myers: Lord of the Dead. The story would have opened immediately after the events of the previous film and involved Tommy Doyle discovering that the entire town of Haddonfield was involved in a conspiracy to control Michael Myers. Farrands compared the story to The Wicker Man, The Hitcher, Rosemary's Baby, Shirley Jackson's "The Lottery," and Dennis Etchison's rejected screenplay for Halloween 4: The Return of Michael Myers. Farrands later decided not to continue with the series "since I honestly could not bear to watch another one of my scripts turned into a debacle – especially another Halloween."

Another idea pitched after the Farrands treatment was Halloween 7: Two Faces of Evil, written by Robert Zappia. Originally intended to be a direct-to-video film, this would have involved Michael Myers stalking an all women's boarding school. The plot eventually also revealed a copycat killer, causing many fans to compare such a twist to The Silence of the Lambs. The pitch itself was changed a couple of times, changing the title to Halloween: Blood Ties as they involved Laurie Strode into the storyline, before scrapping the idea entirely.

The screenplay was based on a story by Kevin Williamson, with the original working title for the film being Halloween 7: The Revenge of Laurie Strode. Williamson was initially hired to write a script, and the story was situated as a sequel to the previous six films, thereby keeping the timeline's continuity. When Williamson first outlined Halloween H20, he created the storyline in which Laurie Strode has faked her own death and taken on a new identity as a specific way of retconning the character's death in Halloween 4. In Williamson's original treatment, there are scenes in which a Hillcrest student does a report on Michael Myers' killing spree, mentioning the death of Jamie, complete with flashbacks to 4–6 mentioned in the text. "Keri"/Laurie responds to hearing the student's report on the death of her daughter by going into a restroom and throwing up.

In the film, the voice of Dr. Loomis is heard giving the same speech that he gave to Sheriff Brackett when they were inside Michael's abandoned childhood home in the original film. Audio clips from Halloween were initially considered when playing his monologue. However, instead of the voice of Donald Pleasence himself, sound-alike voice actor Tom Kane provides this voice-over.

John Carpenter was originally in consideration to be the director for this particular follow-up since Curtis wanted to reunite the cast and crew of the original to have active involvement in it. It was believed that Carpenter opted out because he wanted no active part in the sequel; however, this is not the case. Carpenter agreed to direct the film, but his starting fee as director was $10 million, so he demanded a three-picture deal with Dimension Films. Carpenter's bargain was denied by the Weinsteins, and therefore no deal took place. Carpenter rationalized this by believing the hefty fee was compensation for revenue he had never received from the original Halloween, a matter that was still a contention between Carpenter and Halloween producer Moustapha Akkad even after twenty years. When Akkad balked at Carpenter's fee, Carpenter quit the project. Steve Miner assumed directing.

Scream writer/producer Kevin Williamson was involved in various areas of production. Although not directly credited, he provided rewrites in character dialogue and helped make alterations and sketches of the script. He also came up with the paramedic storyline that explained how Michael survived the ending, which was partially filmed the day after principal photography ended and later utilized in the film's sequel. The writers of Halloween H20 were left with a dilemma when Curtis wanted to end the series, but Moustapha Akkad had a clause that legally wouldn't allow the writers to kill Michael Myers off. According to the Blu-ray released by Scream Factory, Curtis almost left the project just weeks before filming, until Kevin Williamson came up with the paramedic storyline and presented it to Akkad. Curtis finally agreed to be a part of the film under the condition that no footage hinting toward a sequel would be presented by the film, and that the audience would believe that Michael was dead until the inevitable sequel was announced. Halloween: Resurrections first shot of Michael in the paramedic uniform was filmed the day after H20s principal photography ended, according to H20s editor, Patrick Lussier.

The film features an in memoriam tribute to Donald Pleasence in the closing credits, but misspells his last name as "Pleasance."

Filming
Filming began on February 18, 1998 and ended on April 20, 1998. The filming location of the Hillcrest Academy private school was filmed at the Canfield-Moreno Estate located at 1923 Micheltorena St. in Silver Lake, Los Angeles. Marion Chambers's house along with Jimmy Howell's house was filmed in Melrose Hill, Los Angeles. The town of Summer Glen was filmed in La Puente, California. The Hillcrest Academy entrance was filmed in Chatsworth, Los Angeles. The ending of the film was filmed in Canoga Park, Los Angeles.

Music
The original music score was composed by John Ottman, but some music from Scream was added to the chase scenes later on during post-production. Ottman expressed some displeasure about this action in an interview featured on the Halloween: 25 Years of Terror DVD released in 2006. Ottman's score was supplemented with Marco Beltrami's scores from Scream, Scream 2, and Mimic by a team of music editors as well as new cues written by Beltrami during the final days of sound mixing on the film. Dimension Films chief Bob Weinstein demanded musical changes after being dissatisfied with Ottman's score, instating the song "What's This Life For" by rock music group Creed, which is featured in the film during a party sequence and also during the end credits.

In addition, a small tribute to Bernard Herrmann's score from Psycho can be heard as Janet Leigh's character Norma Watson walks to her car (the same model car her character in Psycho drove) before leaving work for the day.

No official soundtrack was ever released for the film, but a compilation album by Ottman was released in the United States and Germany under the Varèse Sarabande label and includes the original score by Ottman and numerous other cuts.

Alternate television version
In February 2003, the FX network premiered an alternate version of the film, adding and extending footage not seen in the original release. It has yet to be released anywhere else, but the deleted scenes can be found on YouTube.

Reception

Box office
Until the release of the 2018 film Halloween, Halloween H20 was the highest-grossing film in the Halloween franchise. It was released on August 5, 1998 in the US and later in many other countries. H20 cost $17 million to produce and returned $55,041,738 in domestic box office sales with an opening weekend of $16,187,724, and $24,753,129 since its Wednesday debut. The film also had an gross of €3,247,003 in Germany equivalent to $3,548,860. Internationally it grossed $20 million for a worldwide total of $75 million.

Critical response
On review aggregator Rotten Tomatoes the film holds an approval rating of 52% based on 63 reviews, with an average rating of 5.6/10. The website's critical consensus reads: "Halloween: H20 is the best of the many sequels, yet still pales in comparison to the original Halloween."  On Metacritic, the film has a weighted average score of 52 out of 100, based on 20 critics, indicating "mixed or average reviews". Audiences polled by CinemaScore gave the film an average grade of "B−" on an A+ to F scale.

Roger Ebert of the Chicago Sun-Times awarded the film two out of four stars, while Lawrence Van Gelder of The New York Times wrote that "the throwaway jokes are few and far between, and after a pre-title sequence reintroduces Michael and shows just how far up suspense and thrills can be ratcheted, Halloween H20 declines into the routine," adding: "Nobody is going to be surprised by who lives and who dies." Bob Graham of the San Francisco Chronicle praised the film's referentiality, as well as Curtis's performance, writing: "Slasher films often seem merely a joke, and with good reason, but in this case that's too bad. Curtis, with her plain, unglamorous appearance, rises to the occasion and delivers as compelling a performance as any this summer." Writing for the Austin Chronicle, Marc Savlov said of the film: "Miner strives to imbue the film with the requisite autumnal haze of the original but then gives up midway through and instead resorts to the standard stalk 'n' slash formulas. It's heartening to see a beloved character revived like this (at one point during the screening I attended, audience members actually stood up and cheered), but H20—for all its good, gory intentions—is barely a shadow of the original."

Home media
Halloween H20 was released on VHS and LaserDisc by Buena Vista Home Video. In the United Kingdom, the film was released on VHS on December 15, 1998.

The film was first released on DVD by Dimension Films on October 19, 1999 as part of the "Dimension Collector's Series". It was released in the UK on October 22, 2001 and re-released on April 25, 2011. It was also released in the UK in 2004 as part of the complete collection consisting of the first eight films, a set that is now out of print. It was re-released in the US by Echo Bridge Home Entertainment on April 26, 2011, although, it does not contain its original aspect ratio of 2.35:1, but rather a 1.66:1 widescreen transfer. Echo Bridge later re-released the film in a triple feature set with Halloween: The Curse of Michael Myers and Halloween: Resurrection.

Halloween H20 was released in Canada on Blu-ray by Alliance along with Halloween: The Curse of Michael Myers and Halloween: Resurrection on January 12, 2010. On May 3, 2011 it was released by Echo Bridge Home Entertainment in the US but with an open matte 16:9 transfer, rather than the theatrical aspect ratio of 2.35:1. Its sound was downmixed to stereo, rather than the 5.1 theatrical mix. The Blu-ray received negative reviews, with Blu-ray.com calling it "a mess on every level". It was also released along with Halloween: The Curse of Michael Myers in one Blu-ray collection.

It was released again on Blu-ray on September 23, 2014 in its original theatrical 2.35:1 aspect ratio and with 5.1 DTS-HD Master Audio in the Halloween: The Complete Collection box set from Anchor Bay Entertainment, with a disc produced by Scream Factory, featuring a new commentary with Jamie Lee Curtis and Steve Miner and extra features including behind the scenes footage and archival interviews not seen on any other release.

On October 4, 2022, Halloween H20 was released by Scream Factory on 4K UHD as part of a 4K/Blu-ray box set along with Halloween: The Curse of Michael Myers and Halloween: Resurrection.

References

External links
 
 
 
 
 

1998 films
1998 horror films
1990s horror thriller films
1990s slasher films
American slasher films
1990s serial killer films
Alternative sequel films
American horror thriller films
American sequel films
American serial killer films
1990s English-language films
7
Films about educators
Fratricide in fiction
Dimension Films films
Miramax films
Films scored by John Ottman
Films scored by Marco Beltrami
Films directed by Steve Miner
Films set in 1998
Films set in California
Films about post-traumatic stress disorder
Films set in Illinois
Films about mother–son relationships
Films about siblings
1990s American films